Karma (born as Mahesh Man Shakya) is a Nepalese film and theater actor known for his roles in Sano Sansar, Loot and Lukamari. He is recognised as a versatile actor in the Nepali film industry. Visa Girl, Suntali and First Love are some of his other notable films.

Early life and career 

Karma was born as Mahesh Man Shakya in Kathmandu, Nepal. He studied at St. Xaviers School in Kathmandu and then went to Pune, India to pursue further studies. He was passionate about acting. One day, he happened to come across a newspaper clipping of Quest Entertainment for a casting call. He thought of giving it a try and was selected as the lead role for Sano Sansar, which marked his debut in the Nepali film industry. Karma has also sung for some Nepali films such as Ghintang Ghisi Twak in Lukamari.

Filmography

References

External links
 
@jikarma on Instagram
Karma on Facebook

Living people
21st-century Nepalese male actors
People from Kathmandu
Nepalese expatriates in India
Year of birth missing (living people)